Orchestral works by Johann Sebastian Bach refers to the compositions in the eleventh chapter of the Bach-Werke-Verzeichnis (BWV, catalogue of Bach's compositions), or, in the New Bach Edition, the compositions in Series VII.

Concertos

The orchestra of the concertos for one or more accompanied soloists (BWV 1041–1044, 1049–1050 and 1052–1065) consists in most cases of strings (two parts for violins and one viola part) and continuo (for example performed on cello and harpsichord). Such orchestra of the Baroque era can be indicated as string orchestra or chamber orchestra. In the 19th-century, the Bach-Gesellschaft published Bach's concertos BWV 1041–1044 and 1046–1065 as chamber music – the designation as orchestral music becoming more common in the second half of the 20th century. Apart from the concertos for more than one performer listed in the sections below, Bach also wrote concertos for a single unaccompanied harpsichordist or organist:
 Weimar concerto transcriptions, BWV 592–596 and 972–987
 Italian Concerto, BWV 971

Violin concertos (BWV 1041–1043)
 BWV 1041 – Violin Concerto in A minor
 BWV 1042 – Violin Concerto in E major
 BWV 1043 – Double Concerto in D minor for two violins

Triple concerto (BWV 1044)

 BWV 1044 – Triple Concerto in A minor for traverso, violin and harpsichord

Opening movement for a cantata, for violin and orchestra (BWV 1045)

 BWV 1045 – Fragment of a sinfonia in D major for violin and orchestra, from an unknown cantata

Brandenburg concertos (BWV 1046–1051)

 BWV 1046.1, formerly BWV 1046a, originally BWV 1071 – Sinfonia in F major (early version of Brandenburg Concerto No. 1)
 BWV 1046.2, formerly BWV 1046 – Brandenburg Concerto No. 1 in F major for violino piccolo, three oboes, bassoon, two corni da caccia, strings and continuo
 BWV 1047 – Brandenburg Concerto No. 2 in F major for trumpet, oboe, recorder, violin, strings and continuo
 BWV 1048 – Brandenburg Concerto No. 3 in G major for three violins, three violas, three cellos and continuo
 BWV 1049 – Brandenburg Concerto No. 4 in G major for violin, two fiauti d'echo (recorders), strings and continuo
 BWV 1050.1, formerly BWV 1050a – Concerto in D major for harpsichord, violin, traverso and strings (early version of Brandenburg Concerto No. 5)
 BWV 1050.2, formerly BWV 1050 – Brandenburg Concerto No. 5 in D major for harpsichord, violin, traverso and strings
 BWV 1051 – Brandenburg Concerto No. 6 in B-flat major for two violas, two violas da gamba, cello and continuo

Keyboard concertos (BWV 1052–1065)

 BWV 1052.1, formerly BWV 1052a – Concerto for harpsichord and strings in D minor
 BWV 1052.2, formerly BWV 1052 – Concerto for harpsichord and strings in D minor (revised version)
 BWV 1053 – Concerto for harpsichord and strings in E major
 BWV 1054 – Concerto for harpsichord and strings in D major (after BWV 1042, Violin Concerto in E major)
 BWV 1055 – Concerto for harpsichord and strings in A major
 BWV 1056 – Concerto for harpsichord and strings in F minor
 BWV 1057 – Concerto for harpsichord, two recorders and strings in F major (after BWV 1049, Brandenburg Concerto No. 4 in G major)
 BWV 1058 – Concerto for harpsichord and strings in G minor (after BWV 1041, Violin Concerto in A minor)
 BWV 1059 – Fragment of a concerto for harpsichord in D minor
 BWV 1060 – Concerto for two harpsichords and strings in C minor
 BWV 1061.1, formerly BWV 1061a – Concerto for two harpsichords in C major (without orchestral accompaniment)
 BWV 1061.2, formerly BWV 1061 – Concerto for two harpsichords and strings in C major
 BWV 1062 – Concerto for two harpsichords and strings in C minor (after BWV 1043, Double Violin Concerto in D minor)
 BWV 1063 – Concerto for three harpsichords and strings in D minor
 BWV 1064 – Concerto for three harpsichords and strings in C major
 BWV 1065 – Concerto for four harpsichords and strings in A minor (after Antonio Vivaldi's concerto for four violins in B minor, RV 580, L'estro Armonico, Op. 3 No. 10)

Reconstructed concertos

In Series VII of the New Bach Edition:
 BWV 1052R – Violin concerto in D minor
 BWV 1055R – Oboe d'amore concerto in A major
 BWV 1056R – Violin concerto in G minor
 BWV 1060R – Concerto for oboe and violin in C minor
 BWV 1064R – Concerto for three violins in D major

Suites (BWV 1066–1070)

 BWV 1066 – Orchestral Suite No. 1 in C major (for woodwinds, strings and continuo); Movements: [Ouverture] (no description, two sections), Courante, Gavotte I & II, Forlane, Menuet I & II, Bourrée I & II, Passepied I & II
 BWV 1067 – Orchestral Suite No. 2 in B minor (for traverso, strings and continuo); Movements: [Ouverture] (no description, two sections), Rondeau, Sarabande, Bourrée I & II, Polonaise & Double, Menuet, Badinerie
 BWV 1068 – Orchestral Suite No. 3 in D major (for oboes, trumpets, timpani, strings and continuo); Movements: [Ouverture] (no description, two sections), Air, Gavotte I & II, Bourrée, Gigue
 BWV 1069 – Orchestral Suite No. 4 in D major (for oboes, bassoon, trumpets, timpani, strings and continuo); Movements: [Ouverture] (no description, two sections), Bourrée I & II, Gavotte, Menuet I & II, Rejouissance
 BWV 1070 – Orchestral Suite in G minor by an unknown composer

Sinfonia (BWV 1071)
 BWV 1071, renumbered as BWV 1046a: early version of the first Brandenburg Concerto.

Orchestral works in the 11th chapter of the Bach-Werke-Verzeichnis (1998)

|- style="background: #E3F6CE;"
| data-sort-value="1041.000" | 1041
| data-sort-value="424.002" | 11.
| data-sort-value="1730-07-01" | 1730
| Concerto for violin and orchestra No. 1
| A min.
| Vl Str Bc
| data-sort-value="000.21 1: 003" | 211: 3451: 233
| data-sort-value="VII/03: 003" | VII/3: 3
| → BWV 1058
| 
|-
| data-sort-value="1042.000" | 1042
| data-sort-value="424.003" | 11.
| 
| Concerto for violin and orchestra No. 2
| E maj.
| Vl Str Bc
| data-sort-value="000.21 1: 021" | 211: 21
| data-sort-value="VII/03: 035" | VII/3: 35
| → BWV 1054
| 
|- style="background: #E3F6CE;"
| data-sort-value="1043.000" | 1043
| data-sort-value="425.001" | 11.
| data-sort-value="1730-12-31" | 1730–1731 or earlier
| data-sort-value="Concerto for violinx2 and orchestra" | Concerto for 2 violins and orchestra – Double Concerto
| D min.
| data-sort-value="Vlx2 Str Bc" | 2Vl Str Bc
| data-sort-value="000.21 1: 041" | 211: 41
| data-sort-value="VII/03: 071" | VII/3: 71
| → BWV 1062
| 
|-
| data-sort-value="1044.000" | 1044
| data-sort-value="425.002" | 11.
| data-sort-value="1727-07-01" | 1727or later 
| Concerto for flute, violin, harpsichord and orchestra – Triple Concerto
| A min.
| Fl Vl Hc Str Bc
| data-sort-value="000.17: 223" | 17: 223
| data-sort-value="VII/03: 105" | VII/3: 105
| data-sort-value="after BWV 0894/1" | after BWV 894/1, 527/2, 894/2
| 
|- style="background: #E3F6CE;"
| data-sort-value="1045.000" | 1045
| data-sort-value="426.002" | 11.
| data-sort-value="1744-12-31" | 1743–1746 
| Cantata opening: "Concerto" (Symphonic movement for violin and orchestra)
| D maj.
| data-sort-value="Vl Trx3 Tmp Obx2 Str Bc" | Vl 3Tr Tmp 2Ob Str Bc
| data-sort-value="000.21 1: 065" | 211: 65
| I/34: 305
| after unknown model by other composer?BWV 1045 at 
|  
|- style="background: #E3F6CE;"
| data-sort-value="1046.200" | 1046.2
| data-sort-value="426.004" | 11.
| 1721-03-24 
| Brandenburg Concerto No. 1
| F maj.
| data-sort-value="Nhox2 Obx2 Bas Vlp Str Bc" | 2Nho 3Ob Bas Vlp Str Bc
| data-sort-value="000.19: 031" | 19: 3
| data-sort-value="VII/02: 031" | VII/2: 3
| after BWV 1046.1; /3, /7 → BWV 207(a)/1, /5a
| 
|- style="background: #E3F6CE;"
| data-sort-value="1046.100" | 1046.1
| data-sort-value="427.002" | 11.
| data-sort-value="1712-12-31" | 1712-1713? 
| Sinfonia (opening of BWV 208?)
| F maj.
| data-sort-value="Nhox2 Obx2 Str Bas Bc" | 2Nho 3Ob Str Bas Bc
| data-sort-value="000.31 1: 069" | 311: 69
| data-sort-value="VII/02: 225" | VII/2: 225
| → BWV 1046.2; /1 → BWV 52/1; was BWV 1046a, 1071
| 
|- style="background: #E3F6CE;"
| data-sort-value="1047.000" | 1047
| data-sort-value="427.003" | 11.
| 1721-03-24 
| Brandenburg Concerto No. 2
| F maj.
| Tr Fl Ob Vl Str Vne Bc
| data-sort-value="000.19: 032" | 19: 3
| data-sort-value="VII/02: 043" | VII/2: 43
| 
| 
|- style="background: #E3F6CE;"
| data-sort-value="1048.000" | 1048
| data-sort-value="427.004" | 11.
| 1721-03-24 
| Brandenburg Concerto No. 3
| G maj.
| data-sort-value="Vlx3 Vlax3 Vcx3 Vne Hc" | 3Vl 3Vla 3Vc Vne Hc
| data-sort-value="000.19: 033" | 19: 3
| data-sort-value="VII/02: 073" | VII/2: 73
| data-sort-value="→ BWV 0174" | → BWV 174/1
| 
|- style="background: #E3F6CE;"
| data-sort-value="1049.000" | 1049
| data-sort-value="427.005" | 11.
| 1721-03-24 
| Brandenburg Concerto No. 4
| G maj.
| data-sort-value="Vl Flx2 Str Vc Vne Bc" | Vl 2Fl Str Vc Vne Bc
| data-sort-value="000.19: 034" | 19: 3
| data-sort-value="VII/02: 099" | VII/2: 99
| → BWV 1057
| 
|- style="background: #E3F6CE;"
| data-sort-value="1050.200" | 1050.2
| data-sort-value="427.006" | 11.
| 1721-03-24 
| Brandenburg Concerto No. 5 (early version)
| D maj.
| Fl Vl Hc Vl Va Vc Vne
| data-sort-value="000.19: 035" | 19: 3
| data-sort-value="VII/02: 145" | VII/2: 145
| after BWV 1050.1
| 
|- 
| data-sort-value="1050.100" | 1050.1
| data-sort-value="427.007" | 11.
| data-sort-value="1720-12-31" | 1720–1721 
| Brandenburg Concerto No. 5 (revised version)
| D maj.
| Fl Vl Hc Vl Va Vne
| data-sort-value="000.19: 038" | 19: 3
| data-sort-value="VII/02: 145" | VII/2: 145
| → BWV 1050.2
| 
|- style="background: #E3F6CE;"
| data-sort-value="1051.000" | 1051
| data-sort-value="428.001" | 11.
| 1721-03-24 
| Brandenburg Concerto No. 6
| B♭ maj.
| data-sort-value="Vlax2 Gamx2 Vc Vne Hc" | 2Vla 2Gam Vc Vne Hc
| data-sort-value="000.19: 036" | 19: 3
| data-sort-value="VII/02: 197" | VII/2: 197
| 
| 
|- style="background: #E3F6CE;"
| data-sort-value="1052.200" | 1052.2
| data-sort-value="429.002" | 11.
| data-sort-value="1738-07-01" | 1738
| data-sort-value="Concerto for harpsichord and orchestra No. 1" | Concerto for harpsichord and orchestra No. 1 (revised version)
| D min.
| Hc Str Bc
| data-sort-value="000.17: 031" | 17: 3
| data-sort-value="VII/04: 003" | VII/4: 3
| data-sort-value="after BWV 0146/1" | after BWV 1052.1, BWV 146/1, /2 and 188/1
| 
|- style="background: #F5F6CE;"
| data-sort-value="1052.100" | 1052.1
| data-sort-value="429.003" | 11.
| data-sort-value="1712-07-01" | before 1726
| data-sort-value="Concerto for harpsichord and orchestra No. 1" | Concerto for harpsichord and orchestra No. 1 (early version)
| D min.
| Hc Str Bc
| data-sort-value="000.17: 031" | 17: 3
| data-sort-value="VII/04: 317" | VII/4: 317
| by Bach, C. P. E.?; → BWV 1052.2, BWV 146/1, /2 and 188/1
| 
|- style="background: #E3F6CE;"
| data-sort-value="1053.000" | 1053
| data-sort-value="429.004" | 11.
| data-sort-value="1738-07-01" | 1738
| data-sort-value="Concerto for harpsichord and orchestra No. 2" | Concerto for harpsichord and orchestra No. 2
| E maj.
| Hc Str Bc
| data-sort-value="000.17: 032" | 17: 3
| data-sort-value="VII/04: 079" | VII/4: 79
| data-sort-value="after BWV 0169/1" | after BWV 169/1, /5 and 49/1
| 
|- style="background: #E3F6CE;"
| data-sort-value="1054.000" | 1054
| data-sort-value="429.005" | 11.
| data-sort-value="1738-07-01" | 1738
| data-sort-value="Concerto for harpsichord and orchestra No. 3" | Concerto for harpsichord and orchestra No. 3
| D maj.
| Hc Str Bc
| data-sort-value="000.17: 033" | 17: 3
| data-sort-value="VII/04: 127" | VII/4: 127
| after BWV 1042
| 
|- style="background: #E3F6CE;"
| data-sort-value="1055.000" | 1055
| data-sort-value="429.006" | 11.
| data-sort-value="1738-07-01" | 1738
| data-sort-value="Concerto for harpsichord and orchestra No. 4" | Concerto for harpsichord and orchestra No. 4
| A maj.
| Hc Str Bc
| data-sort-value="000.17: 034" | 17: 3
| data-sort-value="VII/04: 161" | VII/4: 161
| after BWV 1055R?
| 
|- style="background: #E3F6CE;"
| data-sort-value="1056.000" | 1056
| data-sort-value="430.002" | 11.
| data-sort-value="1738-07-01" | 1738
| data-sort-value="Concerto for harpsichord and orchestra No. 5" | Concerto for harpsichord and orchestra No. 5
| F min.
| Hc Str Bc
| data-sort-value="000.17: 035" | 17: 3
| data-sort-value="VII/04: 197" | VII/4: 197
| after BWV 1056R?; /2 after BWV 156/1
| 
|- style="background: #E3F6CE;"
| data-sort-value="1057.000" | 1057
| data-sort-value="430.003" | 11.
| data-sort-value="1738-07-01" | 1738
| data-sort-value="Concerto for harpsichord and orchestra No. 6" | Concerto for harpsichord and orchestra No. 6
| F maj.
| data-sort-value="Hc Flx2 Str Bc" | Hc 2Fl Str Bc
| data-sort-value="000.17: 036" | 17: 3
| data-sort-value="VII/04: 221" | VII/4: 221
| after BWV 1049
| 
|- style="background: #E3F6CE;"
| data-sort-value="1058.000" | 1058
| data-sort-value="430.004" | 11.
| data-sort-value="1738-07-01" | 1738
| data-sort-value="Concerto for harpsichord and orchestra No. 7" | Concerto for harpsichord and orchestra No. 7
| G min.
| Hc Str Bc
| data-sort-value="000.17: 037" | 17: 3
| data-sort-value="VII/04: 283" | VII/4: 283
| after BWV 1041
| 
|- style="background: #E3F6CE;"
| data-sort-value="1059.000" | 1059
| data-sort-value="430.005" | 11.
| data-sort-value="1738-07-01" | 1738
| data-sort-value="Concerto for harpsichord and orchestra No. 8" | Concerto for harpsichord and orchestra No. 8 (abandoned fragment of 1st movement)
| D min.
| Hc Ob Str Bc
| data-sort-value="000.17: 038" | 17: 3
| data-sort-value="VII/04: 313" | VII/4: 313
| data-sort-value="after BWV 0035/1" | after BWV 35/1 and earlier model (for oboe?); completions/reconstructions usually based on BWV 35/1, /2 and /5
| 
|- style="background: #E3F6CE;"
| data-sort-value="1060.000" | 1060
| data-sort-value="431.001" | 11.
| data-sort-value="1736-07-01" | 1736
| data-sort-value="Concerto for harpsichordx2 and orchestra No. 1" | Concerto for 2 harpsichords and orchestra No. 1
| C min.
| data-sort-value="Hcx2 Str Bc" | 2Hc Str Bc
| data-sort-value="000.21 2: 003" | 212: 3
| data-sort-value="VII/05: 003" | VII/5: 3
| after BWV 1060R?
| 
|-
| data-sort-value="1061.200" | 1061.2
| data-sort-value="431.002" | 11.
| data-sort-value="1742-12-31" | after 1732–1733
| data-sort-value="Concerto for harpsichordx2 and orchestra No. 2" | Concerto for 2 harpsichords and orchestra No. 2
| C maj.
| data-sort-value="Hcx2 Str Bc" | 2Hc Str Bc
| data-sort-value="000.21 2: 039" | 212: 39
| data-sort-value="VII/05: 109" | VII/5: 109
| after BWV 1061.1
| 
|- style="background: #E3F6CE;"
| data-sort-value="1061.100" | 1061.1
| data-sort-value="431.003" | 11.
| data-sort-value="1732-01-01" | 1732–1733 or earlier
| data-sort-value="Concerto for harpsichordx2 No. 2" | Concerto for 2 harpsichords (No. 2)
| C maj.
| data-sort-value="Hcx2" | 2Hc
| data-sort-value="000.21 2: 039" | 212: 39
| data-sort-value="VII/05: 083" | VII/5: 83
| → BWV 1061.2
| 
|- style="background: #E3F6CE;"
| data-sort-value="1062.000" | 1062
| data-sort-value="431.004" | 11.
| data-sort-value="1736-07-01" | 1736
| data-sort-value="Concerto for harpsichordx2 and orchestra No. 3" | Concerto for 2 harpsichords and orchestra No. 3
| C min.
| data-sort-value="Hcx2 Str Bc" | 2Hc Str Bc
| data-sort-value="000.21 2: 083" | 212: 83
| data-sort-value="VII/05: 043" | VII/5: 43
| after BWV 1043
| 
|- style="background: #F5F6CE;"
| data-sort-value="1063.000" | 1063
| data-sort-value="432.002" | 11.
| data-sort-value="1730-07-01" | 1730
| data-sort-value="Concerto for harpsichordx3 and orchestra No. 1" | Concerto for 3 harpsichords and orchestra No. 1
| D min.
| data-sort-value="Hcx3 Str Bc" | 3Hc Str Bc
| data-sort-value="000.31 3: 003" | 313: 3
| data-sort-value="VII/06: 003" | VII/6: 3
| after unknown model?
| 
|- style="background: #F5F6CE;"
| data-sort-value="1064.000" | 1064
| data-sort-value="432.003" | 11.
| data-sort-value="1730-07-01" | 1730
| data-sort-value="Concerto for harpsichordx3 and orchestra No. 2" | Concerto for 3 harpsichords and orchestra No. 2
| C maj.
| data-sort-value="Hcx3 Str Bc" | 3Hc Str Bc
| data-sort-value="000.31 3: 053" | 313: 53
| data-sort-value="VII/06: 055" | VII/6: 55
| after BWV 1064R?
| 
|- style="background: #E3F6CE;"
| data-sort-value="1065.000" | 1065
| data-sort-value="433.002" | 11.
| data-sort-value="1730-07-01" | 1730
| data-sort-value="Concerto for harpsichordx4 and orchestra" | Concerto for 4 harpsichords and orchestra
| A min.
| data-sort-value="Hcx4 Str Bc" | 4Hc Str Bc
| data-sort-value="000.43 1: 071" | 431: 71
| data-sort-value="VII/06: 117" | VII/6: 117
| after Vivaldi, Op. 3 No. 10
| 
|- style="background: #E3F6CE;"
| data-sort-value="1066.000" | 1066
| data-sort-value="433.003" | 11.
| data-sort-value="1724-02-28" | May 1724–End 1725
| Orchestral Suite No. 1
| C maj.
| data-sort-value="Obx2 Bas Str Bc" | 2Ob Bas Str Bc
| data-sort-value="000.31 1: 003" | 311: 3
| data-sort-value="VII/01: 003" | VII/1: 3
| Ouverture Courante 2Gavotte Forlane 2Minuet 2Bourrée 2Passepied
| 
|- style="background: #E3F6CE;"
| data-sort-value="1067.000" | 1067
| data-sort-value="434.002" | 11.
| data-sort-value="1738-12-31" | 1738–1739
| Orchestral Suite No. 2
| B min.
| Fl Str Bc
| data-sort-value="000.31 1: 024" | 311: 24
| data-sort-value="VII/01: 027" | VII/1: 27
| Ouverture Rondeau Sarabande 2Bourrée 2Polonaise Minuet Badinerie
| 
|- style="background: #E3F6CE;"
| data-sort-value="1068.000" | 1068
| data-sort-value="435.002" | 11.
| data-sort-value="1730-07-01" | 1730
| Orchestral Suite No. 3
| D maj.
| data-sort-value="Trx3 Tmp Obx2 Str Bc" | 3Tr Tmp 2Ob (Vl) Str Bc
| data-sort-value="000.31 1: 040" | 311: 40
| data-sort-value="VII/01: 049" | VII/1: 49,119
| Ouverture Air 2Gavotte Bourrée Gigue
| 
|-
| data-sort-value="1069.000" | 1069
| data-sort-value="436.001" | 11.
| data-sort-value="1727-07-01" | before late 1727
| Orchestral Suite No. 4
| D maj.
| data-sort-value="Trx3 Tmp Obx2 Bas Str Bc" | 3Tr Tmp 2Ob Bas Str Bc
| data-sort-value="000.31 1: 066" | 311: 66
| data-sort-value="VII/01: 079" | VII/1: 79
| Ouverture 2Bourrée Gavotte 2Minuet Réjouissance; /1 → BWV 110/1
| 
|-
| data-sort-value="1071.000" | 1071
| data-sort-value="436.003" | 

|

| data-sort-value="Sinfonia" | 

| data-sort-value="F maj." |

| 

| 

| 

| see BWV 1046.1
| 
|}

References

Sources
 

 
Orchestral works by Johann Sebastian Bach, List of
Bach, Johann Sebastian, List of orchestral works by